The 2001 Texaco/Havoline Grand Prix of Houston was a Championship Auto Racing Teams (CART) motor race held on October 7, 2001 on the streets of Houston, Texas, USA. It was the 18th round of the 2001 CART FedEx Championship Series season. Gil de Ferran took his second win of the season for Team Penske after starting on pole position and leading every lap ahead of Dario Franchitti and Memo Gidley.

de Ferran inherited the lead of the drivers' standings from Kenny Bräck by virtue of his win here and at the previous race at Rockingham, a lead he would not relinquish for the rest of the season. The difficult road course on the streets of Houston meant that little on-track passing could occur, and de Ferran's position throughout the race was rarely in jeopardy. Franchitti was one of the few that could muscle his way through the field despite being hit by Hélio Castroneves at the start of the race, taking his third podium finish at Houston in four starts and his third podium of the season. Gidley, after starting 23rd, used pit strategy to move his way through the field and take his second podium of the season and his career.

The race saw multiple incidents and crashes as drivers struggled around the temporary circuit. Alex Tagliani, despite running near the front for the entire race, crashed from 2nd place with just seven laps remaining. Oriol Servià and Michel Jourdain Jr. also crashed on Lap 37, with Servià's car ending up on top of Jourdain's.

This was the final time CART would race at this track configuration in Houston; the series would return in 2006 and 2007 using a temporary circuit at NRG Park, while the IndyCar Series would race in Houston from 2013-2014.

Qualifying

Race

– Includes two bonus points for leading the most laps and being the fastest qualifier.

Race statistics
Lead changes: 0 among 0 drivers

Standings after the race

Drivers' standings 

Constructors' standings

Manufacturer's Standings

References

Houston Grand Prix, 2001